Bassi is a department or commune of Zondoma Province in western Burkina Faso. Its capital lies at the town of Bassi.

Towns and villages

References

Departments of Burkina Faso
Zondoma Province